Kalivoda (feminine Kalivodová) is a Czech surname, sometimes germanised as Kalliwoda. Notable people with the surname include:

 Andrea Kalivodová, Czech opera singer
 David Kalivoda, Czech footballer
 Jan Kalivoda, Czech composer
 Marek Kalivoda, Czech football manager
 Viktor Kalivoda, Czech spree killer

See also
Kalvoda

Czech-language surnames